Glen Robinson (born 28 June 1971) is a Guyanese cricketer. He played in four List A matches for Guyana in 1994/95 and 1995/96.

See also
 List of Guyanese representative cricketers

References

External links
 

1971 births
Living people
Guyanese cricketers
Guyana cricketers